Merenii Noi is a village in the Anenii Noi District of Moldova. It is home to the Dionysos-Mereni SA winery. Of 1,512 inhabitants, 1,303 are ethnic Romanians, 66 Ukrainians, 67 Russians, 30 Gagauzes, 28 Bulgarians, 1 Jew, 10 Gypsies, and 7 other/undeclared.

References

External links
Dionysos-Mereni Winery homepage

Villages of Anenii Noi District